The Grangeston Halt railway station was a private station that was not listed in the public timetables, located in a rural part of South Ayrshire, Scotland and served the WWII Grangeston ICI munitions plant bringing workers to the site. Grant's Distillery now occupies much of the site.

History 
Where Grant's Distillery is now at Grangeston in WWII  was an ICI munitions factory producing flashless cordite that was served by sidings from the Maidens and Dunure line which joined at a north facing junction. The Grangeston depot was also served by a passenger facility named Grangeston Halt that was located on the Maybole and Girvan Railway line and closed in 1965.

"At the onset of the Second World War (1939-1945), the British Government decided to massively expand its capability to produce explosives for filling shells and as propellant for gun and rifle cartridges. Instead of creating another giant factory like the First World War (1914-1918) munitions works at Gretna and Eastriggs, production was spread around a large number of government-run sites like ROF Bishopton near Glasgow and agency industrial works like the ICI explosive works at Ardeer in Ayrshire. ICI saw a need to increase production by establishing six new factories in South West Scotland. These were Ministry of Supply factories run and staffed by ICI as 'Agency Factories'."

Station infrastructure
The station was located on a double track section of the line and had a brick built platform with concrete edging. One overgrown platform still exists and the line has been singled.

Workings
A Southern Railway 0-4-2T locomotive, Stroudley class D1 no. 2284 was allocated to Girvan railway station and Smith records that "It proved useful ... as a substitute for the diesel shunter at Grangeston munitions factory, which shunter that had a habit of breaking down. A two-platform halt was erected at Grangeston and two workers' trains ran to it from Ayr each morning.  These trains went on to Girvan station, reversing there and going to Turnberry ... Two similar trains worked back in the evening."

Micro-history
The Grangeston ICI munitions factory was linked to the Maidens and Dunure Light Railway and the tracks were lifted in 1961. An internal narrow gauge railway system existed.

It has been proposed that a freight facility should be built here to serve the industrial estate, to be known as Girvan Grangeston.

References

Notes

Sources 
 Butt, R. V. J. (1995). The Directory of Railway Stations: details every public and private passenger station, halt, platform and stopping place, past and present (1st ed.). Sparkford: Patrick Stephens Ltd. .
 Coia, Paul (2012). AyrLine. Driver's eye view. Stranraer to Glasgow. Video125. DVD.
 
 Smith, David L. (1980). Legends of the Glasgow and South Western Railway in the L.M.S. Days. Newton Abbot : David & Charles. .
 Wham, Alasdair (2013). Ayrshire's Forgotten Railways. A Walker's Guide. Usk : Oakwood Press. .

External links
 Video footage of Grangeston Halt
 Railscot on the Maybole and Girvan Railway

Disused railway stations in South Ayrshire
Railway stations in Great Britain opened in 1941
Railway stations in Great Britain closed in 1965
Former London, Midland and Scottish Railway stations